Mark James Perry (born 19 October 1978, in Ealing) is an English former professional footballer who played in the Football League for Queens Park Rangers at right back and in midfield.

Perry made his debut for Queens Park Rangers as a 17-year-old in September 1996, in a 3–1 win against Barnsley at Oakwell. He scored from a header on debut, which proved to be the only goal of his senior career. He played 75 games in all competitions before a knee injury forced his retirement at the age of only 23. Perry also played for the England national under-18 football team. He managed Hayes Gate in the Combined Counties Football League.

References

1978 births
Living people
Footballers from Ealing
English footballers
Association football midfielders
Queens Park Rangers F.C. players
English Football League players